"Everyday" is a song by the British rock band Slade, released in 1974 as the second single from the band's fourth studio album Old New Borrowed and Blue. It was written by lead vocalist Noddy Holder, bassist Jim Lea and his wife Louise Lea (uncredited), and produced by Chas Chandler. It reached No. 3 in the UK, spending seven weeks on the chart. The single was certified UK Silver by BPI in April 1974, only three days after its release.

In 2013, the song was used in a UK advert for the Nexus 7 tablet. As a result, it re-entered the UK chart in late November and peaked at No. 69 the following month, due to downloads.

Background
With the release of Old New Borrowed and Blue in February 1974, the band's manager Chas Chandler suggested "Everyday" be released as the second single from the album. The band's popularity in the UK meant that there was a big demand for a new release. However, the band, particularly Lea, did not feel the song was single material. On a flight to Australia for a short tour there, Chandler and Lea argued about the idea, however Chandler ultimately won, and "Everyday" was released as a single in March. Being a piano-led ballad, which was an unusual style for Slade, the band knew they were taking a risk. "Everyday" reached No. 3 in the UK and would go on to become a regular sing-a-long inclusion at the band's concerts.

The idea for "Everyday" came out of an evening at Lea's house where he was entertaining friends. Responding to the question of how he wrote songs, Lea said "easy, anyone can do it" and each person then attempted to come up with their idea for a song on the spot. Lea's wife Louise had come up with an idea, which formed the basis of "Everyday"'s verse. Lea later developed her idea further to become a Slade song. Once he had finished the music and some more of the lyrics, Holder finished the final lyrics off. During the recording of the song, guitarist Dave Hill was abroad on his honeymoon so Lea played the guitar solo.

During a 2017 live question and answer event with Lea at the Robin 2 club, Lea was asked whether his wife received a writing credit for the song. He replied: "No, she didn't. I feel really bad about that and I have spoken to Nod about it. She should have a credit, it should be Lea, Lea, Holder. Why I didn't credit Lou on it was because it wasn't that long before with the John and Yoko thing going on, where Yoko was in the studio all the time and it was messing about with the Beatles. And I didn't want to have that sort of pressure. I mean, Lou wouldn't have done it anyway, she would never have pressured me. She should have a credit now I think, I should put it to the publishers that that's what we should do."

Release
"Everyday" was released on 7" vinyl by Polydor Records in the UK, Ireland, across Europe, Australia, New Zealand, South Africa and Japan. The B-side, "Good Time Gals", had also previously appeared as an album track on Old New Borrowed and Blue.

Promotion
No music video was filmed to promote the single. In the UK, the band performed the song twice on the music show Top of The Pops (28 March and 11 April), and on Clunk Click. The band also performed the song on the Dutch AVRO TV show TopPop.

Critical reception
Upon release, Record Mirror noted the song's "quite remarkable change of style" for Slade. They felt it showed the "plaintive side" of Holder, had a "lovely little melody" and a "nice performance". Believing the record to be a "smash hit", the reviewer concluded: "...already one of my favourite Slade efforts". Sounds stated: ""Everyday" is a dashed fine record. The performance remains plaintive and even touching. There's some muscular guitar but it never threatens to destroy the mood either." Disc described "Everyday" as a "lovely song, sung with considerable feeling by Noddy".

In a retrospective review of Old New Borrowed and Blue, Dave Thompson of AllMusic stated: ""Everyday" held the secret of the band's future, a crowd-swaying singalong of such scarf-waving majesty that it might well be single-handedly responsible for every great record U2 has ever made." In 2005, BBC Radio 2 ranked the song at No. 9 of 100 in their "Sold on Song" library, commenting on Holder's "decidedly affectionate and most un-Slade-like lyrics". They added: "It was a rare sentimental concession from the band who built their reputation on some of the best-loved rock 'n' roll of the 1970s."

Track listing
7" single
 "Everyday" - 3:05
 "Good Time Gals" - 3:28

Chart performance

Weekly charts

Year-end charts

Cover versions
 In 1992, Finnish actor and singer Samuli Edelmann recorded the song which appeared on the album Yön Valot under the title "Enkeli". Finnish musician Kari Kuivalainen was given writing credit for the changed lyrics.
 In 2005, English hard rock band The Quireboys released a cover of the song as B-Side to their single "Tears in Heaven".

Personnel
Slade
Noddy Holder - lead vocals, guitar
Jim Lea - piano, lead guitar, bass, backing vocals
Don Powell - drums

Additional personnel
Chas Chandler - producer

References

1974 singles
1970s ballads
Slade songs
Songs written by Noddy Holder
Songs written by Jim Lea
Song recordings produced by Chas Chandler
1974 songs
Polydor Records singles